Kim Tae-shik (Hangul: 김태식, Hanja: 金泰式; born July 4, 1957 in Mukho, Gangwon-do, South Korea) is a former boxer from South Korea.

Pro career
In 1980, Kim became the WBA Flyweight champion with a 2-round KO win over Luis Ibarra. He defended the belt once before losing it to Peter Mathebula by a controversial 2-1, split decision in the same year.

In 1981, Kim challenged Antonio Avelar for the WBC Flyweight title but was knocked out in the second round.

In 1982, Kim defeated Roberto Ramirez in a non-title bout by split decision. However, he lost consciousness within a short time after the decision. Kim was immediately taken to hospital and had emergency surgery to remove a blood clot from his brain. He spent three days in a coma and after which, Kim was forced into retirement.

External links
 

1957 births
World flyweight boxing champions
Flyweight boxers
World Boxing Association champions
Living people
South Korean male boxers
People from Donghae City
Sportspeople from Gangwon Province, South Korea